The Am 6/6, later known as Am 861, is a class of diesel shunting locomotive which were built for the Swiss Federal Railways (SBB) and were intended for use as heavy hump shunters at the Limmattal classification yard.

A total of six locomotives were built jointly by Thyssen Henschel and Brown, Boveri & Cie for SBB by and these received running numbers . In the late 1990s they received modernized electrical systems

The locomotives utilized a Co′Co′ wheel arrangement and a diesel-electric transmission, had six three-phase asynchronous traction motors and Flexifloat bogies (bogies without pivots and cradles) while being powered by 1.440 kW (1,930 hp) diesel engines.

In January 2004 locomotive 18524 was withdrawn to serve as a parts donor for the remainder of the class. The other five locomotives continued in service with SBB until March 2020, by which point the remainder were withdrawn from service. As of April 2020 these locomotives are awaiting to be scrapped.

See also
 List of stock used by Swiss Federal Railways

References

Am 6 6
Co′Co′ locomotives
Diesel locomotives of Switzerland
Standard gauge locomotives of Switzerland
Railway locomotives introduced in 1976